The Inner London Probation Service existed until 31 March 2001 when it was succeeded by the larger London Probation Area. Its final Chief Probation Officer was John Harding, later visiting professor at the University of Hertfordshire. He succeeded Graham Smith, who went on to be the Chief Inspector of Probation in England and Wales and was knighted towards the end of his career.

At an earlier point it was known as the Inner London Probation and After Care Service.

Its boundaries were the same as ILEA (the Inner London Education Service) and it consisted of the 12 Inner London boroughs.

A book about its early years  was written by a former employee.  It is now called the London Probation Service and includes some of the outer London Boroughs. Website /www.london-probation.org.uk/

Penal system in England
Prison and correctional agencies
Defunct organisations based in London
Crime in London
2001 disestablishments in England